Neissa nigrina is a species of beetle in the family Cerambycidae. It was described by Pascoe in 1866. It is known from Australia.

References

Lamiinae
Beetles described in 1866